Abbassa Malik (Arabic: عباسة ماليك) (born June 3, 1989), also known as Malikpc, is an Algerian grey hat hacker who was threatened with death by the Israeli Mossad on February 1, 2012 after hacking several Israeli sites. He also defaced dozens of French sites. He later specialized in programming.

See also 
 List of computer criminals

References

External links 
Official website 
zone-h

1989 births
Living people
Hacking (computer security)